The AIC Goalkeeper of the Year was a yearly award organized by the Italian Footballers' Association (AIC) since 1997 to 2010 as part of the Oscar del Calcio awards, given to the goalkeeper who had been considered to have performed the best over the previous Serie A season.

Since 2011, a goalkeeper is chosen as part of the Serie A Team of the Year award within the Gran Galà del Calcio awards event.

Winners

Serie A Goalkeeper of the Year

Goalkeeper in Serie A Team of the Year

By club

By country

Multiple winners

References

See also
Gran Galà del Calcio
Serie A Team of the Year
Serie A Awards

Serie A trophies and awards
Oscar del Calcio
Awards established in 1997